This Was Paris is a 1942 British Second World War spy film directed by John Harlow and starring Ann Dvorak, Ben Lyon and Griffith Jones.

It was shot at Teddington Studios.

Plot
British Captain Bill Hamilton meets and is attracted to American fashion designer Ann Morgan in Paris during the Phoney War stage of hostilities. He also makes the acquaintance of Sydney-Chronicle reporter Butch. Later, he is assigned by MI5 to investigate Ann. The fashion house where she works is a center of German fifth columnists, headed by Van Der Stuyl and Madame Florien. MI5 suspects Ann herself is a spy, but Bill is certain she is innocent. Her friend, Count Raul De La Vague, however, has been gulled by Van Der Stuyl and Madame Florien into believing that they are working for Franco-German peace and cooperation against communism. The count is told to donate an ambulance to the French cause. A German spy conceals a message inside the door.

Then the Germans invade France through neutral Luxembourg, the Netherlands and Belgium, bypassing the Maginot Line. Ann is ordered to drive the ambulance to the front line. Unable to convince her that her employers are enemy agents, Bill stows away in the back. The pair are forced to take cover when German bombers appear overhead. A direct hit destroys the vehicle, but a waiting agent finds the message. Bill takes the man prisoner, but he escapes with the message on the way to a French military headquarters. As a result, the Germans are able to capture a vital bridge intact, and tanks pour across it into France.

Bill is given a staff car, but it is later commandeered by French officers, forcing the pair to walk. On the way back to Paris, they find a small, abandoned amusement park. Only the owner, Popinard, is left. He refuses to leave with the couple. He remains behind, holding an antiquated gun. Bill and Ann reach Paris and exchange words with the triumphant Madam Florien before joining the stream of refugees.

Cast

References

External links

1942 films
1940s spy films
British spy films
British war films
British black-and-white films
Films directed by John Harlow
Films set in France
Films set in Paris
Films set in 1940
World War II films made in wartime
Films shot at Teddington Studios
Warner Bros. films
Films scored by Jack Beaver
1940s English-language films
1940s British films